Magyar Kupa is the main domestic cup for Hungarian women's team handball clubs, which is organized and supervised by the Hungarian Handball Federation. The competition is held annually, starting in September and concluding in April. The teams play in a one-leg knockout system with a final four tournament in the end. The winner of the Hungarian cup get the right to participate in the next year's EHF Cup Winners' Cup, unless they secure a place in the EHF Champions League. If happens so, then the runners-up take the opportunity to represent Hungary in the forthcoming continental event for cup winners.

Winners
In 1954 and 1955 the cup was held on a grand scale. In 1983 they played two series (in February and December). In 1967, 1968, 1985 and 1986 the finals were played only in the following year.
Previous cup winners are: 

 1951: Magyar Posztó
 1952: Magyar Posztó
 1953: Vörös Meteor
 1954: Vörös Meteor
 1955: Ferencváros
 1956: Bp. Szikra
 1957–62: Not Played
 1963: Bp. Spartacus
 1964: Goldberger
 1965: Testnevelési Főiskola
 1966: Testnevelési Főiskola
 1967: Ferencváros
 1968: Bp. Spartacus
 1969: Vasas
 1970: Ferencváros
 1971: Vasas
 1972: Ferencváros
 1973: Veszprém
 1974: Vasas
 1975: Not Played
 1976: Vasas
 1977: Ferencváros
 1978: Vasas
 1979: Vasas
 1980: Vasas
 1981: Vasas
 1982: Vasas
 1983 : Vasas
 1983 : Veszprém
 1984: Vasas
 1985: Debreceni VSC
 1986: Vasas
 1987: Debreceni VSC
 1988: Bp. Spartacus
 1988/89: Debreceni VSC
 1989/90: Debreceni VSC
 1990/91: Debreceni VSC
 1991/92: Építők
 1992/93: Ferencváros
 1993/94: Ferencváros
 1994/95: Ferencváros
 1995/96: Ferencváros
 1996/97: Ferencváros
 1997/98: Dunaferr
 1998/99: Dunaferr
 1999/00: Dunaferr
 2000/01: Ferencváros
 2001/02: Dunaferr
 2002/03: Ferencváros
 2003/04: Dunaferr
 2004/05: Győri ETO
 2005/06: Győri ETO
 2007/07: Győri ETO
 2007/08: Győri ETO
 2008/09: Győri ETO
 2009/10: Győri ETO
 2010/11: Győri ETO
 2011/12: Győri ETO
 2012/13: Győri ETO
 2013/14: Győri ETO
 2014/15: Győri ETO
 2015/16: Győri ETO
 2016/17: Ferencváros
 2017/18: Győri ETO
 2018/19: Győri ETO
 2019/20: Cancelled
 2020/21: Győri ETO 
 2021/22: Ferencváros

Finals
The following table contains all the finals from the sixty years long history of the Magyar Kupa. In some occasions, there was not held a final match but a final tournament. In these cases, the team with the most total points have been crowned as cup winners.

Performances

By club
The performance of various clubs is shown in the following table:

Notes

By county

 The bolded teams are currently playing in the 2018-19 season of the Hungarian League.

Dunaferr* as Dunaújvárosi Kohász KA

Statistics

Records in the Final
Most wins: 15
Győri ETO (2005, 2006, 2007, 2008, 2009, 2010, 2011, 2012, 2013, 2014, 2015, 2016, 2018, 2019, 2021)
Most consecutive titles: 12
Győri ETO (2005, 2006, 2007, 2008, 2009, 2010, 2011, 2012, 2013, 2014, 2015, 2016)
Most consecutive appearances: 16
Győri ETO (2004, 2005, 2006, 2007, 2008, 2009, 2010, 2011, 2012, 2013, 2014, 2015, 2016, 2017, 2018, 2019, 2021 - winning fourteen)
Most appearances: 24
Ferencváros (1963, 1967, 1970, 1972, 1973, 1977, 1978, 1985, 1993, 1994, 1995, 1996, 1997, 1998, 1999, 2001, 2003, 2007, 2010, 2013, 2014, 2015, 2017, 2019)
Biggest win:
Győri ETO 42–22 Békéscsabai Előre (2012)
Most goals in a final: 64
Győri ETO 42–22 Békéscsabai Előre (2012)
Győri ETO 36–28 Ferencváros (2013)
Most goals by a losing side: 29
Győri ETO 34–29 Ferencváros (2014)
Győri ETO 32–29 Ferencváros (2019)
Most defeats: 12
Ferencváros (1963, 1973, 1978, 1985, 1998, 1999, 2007, 2010, 2013, 2014, 2015, 2019)

Finals venues and host cities
In the list below are included all the stadiums, inclusive the stadiums from finals with 2 legs.

Sponsorship

See also
 Nemzeti Bajnokság I 
 Hungarian handball clubs in European competitions

References

External links
 Hungarian Handball Federation official website
 IT help for Hungarian handball competitions

Magyar Kupa Women
 
Women's handball competitions